Engelbert III  (died 6 October 1173), a member of the Rhenish Franconian House of Sponheim, was Margrave of Istria from 1124 until his death.

Life
Engelbert was the second son of Margrave Engelbert II and his first wife Uta of Passau. When his father succeeded his elder brother Henry as Duke of Carinthia, Engelbert III received the margravial title in Istria. However, he mainly ruled in the Sponheim estates around Kraiburg in Bavaria, bequested by his mother. 

In 1135 Emperor Lothair III dispatched him to a synod at Pisa in Italy, in order to back Pope Innocent II against Antipope Anacletus II. In turn, Engelbert was vested with the Imperial March of Tuscany, but was succeeded by the Welf duke Henry X of Bavaria already in 1137. Engelbert attended the 1156 Imperial Diet in Regensburg, where he witnessed the granting of the Privilegium Minus by Emperor Frederick Barbarossa, elevating the March of Austria to a duchy.

In 1140 Engelbert had married Matilda, youngest daughter of the Bavarian count Berengar II of Sulzbach. He was thus a brother-in-law of Gertrude of Sulzbach, consort of King Conrad III of Germany, and Bertha of Sulzbach, as Irene wife of the Byzantine Emperor Manuel I Komnenos. Matilda died late in 1165, the marriage remained childless. The margravial title in Istria passed to the Bavarian Counts of Andechs.

His son Pellegrino was Patriarch of Aquileia in northern Italy from 1195 to 1204.

Notes

References

Sources

External links
Medieval Lands Project: Nobility of Northern Italy (900–1100).

1173 deaths
12th-century people of the Holy Roman Empire
Margraves of Istria
Margraves of Carniola
Margraves of Tuscany
House of Sponheim
Austrian people of German descent
Year of birth unknown